Wu Yi is a fleet oiler and logistics ship of the Republic of China Navy (ROCN). She is the only ship of the Wu Yi class. She was the first ship of the ROCN to include accommodations for female officers.

Design 
She is heavily armed for a fleet oiler, including a Sea Chaparral system.

History 
The ship was launched in 1990. Wu Yi has faced significant issues with her hull, machinery, and steering which has limited her ability to fulfill her mission of providing global support for naval task forces.

See also 
 Replenishment oiler

References 

Auxiliary ships of the Republic of China Navy
Ships built in the Republic of China